Klaus Hänsch (born 15 December 1938 in Szprotawa) is a German politician. He was a Member of the European Parliament representing the SPD from 17 July 1979 until 13 July 2009, and sat with the Party of European Socialists group. He was vice-chairman of the PES group since 1989, except during his service as President of the European Parliament from 1994 to 1997.

External links 

  Official site
 Official page on the European Parliament website

1938 births
Living people
People from Szprotawa
People from the Province of Lower Silesia
Presidents of the European Parliament
MEPs for Germany 1989–1994
MEPs for Germany 1994–1999
MEPs for Germany 1999–2004
Social Democratic Party of Germany MEPs
Grand Crosses with Star and Sash of the Order of Merit of the Federal Republic of Germany